Laimer Platz is an U-Bahn station in Munich on the U5 line of the Munich U-Bahn system.

See also
List of Munich U-Bahn stations

References

Munich U-Bahn stations
Railway stations in Germany opened in 1988
1988 establishments in West Germany